Domingo de la Anunciación (1510–1591), born Juan de Ecija (also spelled as Ecía), was a Spanish Dominican missionary in New Spain (now Mexico).

Biography
He was born in Fuente Ovejuna as Juan de Ecija and requested to be admitted to the Order of St. Francis at age 13 but was denied. After his father, Hernando de Ecija died, Juan along with his elder brother Hernando de Paz, moved in 1528 to New Spain where Hernando de Paz became a secretary to the Royal Audiencia of Mexico and eventually became spoiled with his prosperity. Whereas Juan was smarter and became a member of the Dominican Order and assumed his new name Domingo de la Anunciación. He was considered of the most zealous instructors of the Mexican Indians and during the epidemic of 1545, went from village to village to attend the natives, thoughtless of his own health. In 1559, he, along with three priests including Domingo de Salazar and a lay brother, accompanied Tristán de Luna y Arellano on his periled expedition to Florida, particularly southwestern Florida including what is now the Caloosahatchee River, where they were shipwrecked and deprived of resources. After de la Anunciación returned to Mexico, he returned to Mexico to continue teaching until becoming blind in 1585 and his death in 1591. After his brother's death, Herando de Paz became a Dominican and a member of the order.

In 1565 he published a bilingual Spanish/Nahuatl book of Christian doctrine, Doctrina cristiana breve y compendiosa por vía de diálogo entre un maestro y un discípulo. It is his only known work. Agustín Dávila Padilla also wrote about him. Diego Aduarte also mentioned de la Anunciación in one of his works.

References

External links
Digital edition of Doctrina cristiana

1510 births
1591 deaths
Spanish Roman Catholic missionaries
Roman Catholic missionaries in New Spain
Spanish Dominicans
16th-century Spanish people
16th-century Spanish writers
16th-century male writers